European Taekwondo Junior Championships is a European bienal championship organized for juniors age category by European Taekwondo Union, first held in 1978. The event is contested every two years.

Editions
All of results from 1978 to 2021 exist in Continental Tournaments section in European Championships: http://www.taekwondodata.com/resultlist_select.html
Dont remove this comment , you can help to complete results from 1978 to 2021.

Medals (1978–2021)
Source:

See also
 European Taekwondo Championships
 European Taekwondo Championships Olympic Weight Categories
 European Universities Taekwondo Championships
 World Juniors Taekwondo Championships

References

External links
Official site of the European Taekwondo Union

 
Taekwondo junior
Taekwondo competitions
Taekwondo
Taekwondo in Europe
Recurring sporting events established in 1978
1978 establishments in Europe